Ivan Dmitriyevich Andreyev (born 11 April 2000) is a Russian football player. He plays for FC Dynamo Saint Petersburg.

Club career
He made his debut in the Russian Football National League for FC Tom Tomsk on 24 March 2019 in a game against FC Mordovia Saransk.

References

External links
 Profile by Russian Football National League

2000 births
Footballers from Saint Petersburg
Living people
Russian footballers
Association football midfielders
FC Tom Tomsk players
FC Zenit-2 Saint Petersburg players
FC Dynamo Saint Petersburg players
Russian First League players
Russian Second League players